The Clare River is a river that is part of the Moira River system in the Lake Ontario drainage basin in Hastings and Lennox and Addington Counties, Ontario, Canada.

Course
It then turns west and passes into the municipality of Tweed, Hastings County. The Moira River flows into the Bay of Quinte on Lake Ontario at Belleville.

See also  
List of rivers of Ontario

References

Rivers of Hastings County
Rivers of Lennox and Addington County